The 9K121 Vikhr (NATO reporting name: AT-16 Scallion) is a Russian laser beam riding anti-tank missile. "9K121" is the GRAU designation for the missile system. The missile can be launched from warships, Ka-50 and Ka-52 helicopters, and Su-25T aircraft. It was first shown publicly at the 1992 Farnborough Airshow.

Description
The missile is designed to engage vital ground targets, including armoured targets fitted out with built-in and add-on explosive reactive armor, at a range of up to 8 km when fired from a helicopter and 10 km when fired from a fixed-wing aircraft in daytime and up to 5 km at night, as well as air targets in conditions of air defense assets activity.

The Vikhr-1 missile is part of the Vikhr-M system, which also includes an automatic sight and a depressible launcher. Adopted in 1990. The missile was upgraded in 2021.

The automatic sight is provided with TV and IR channels for target sighting, a laser beam channel for missile control, a laser rangefinder, an automatic target tracking unit, a digital computer and a system for stabilization and aiming the sighting and beam channels. The automatic sight provides for target detection and identification both by day and night, automatic target tracking and missile guidance, and generates exact information for gun and rocket firing. The guided missile consists of a HEAT fragmentation warhead fitted with a contact and a proximity fuze, an air-dynamic control actuator, control electronics, a motor and laser detector. It is kept in a sealed launching transporting container.

The multi-purpose warhead (two-stage HEAT and an additional fragmentation sleeve) allows the missile to be used against armoured, airborne and area targets alike. This is an advantage compared to the three different missiles required in the 9M120 Ataka-V complex. The use of the proximity fuze allows a near miss of up to 5 m and makes it possible to engage an air target at speeds of 500 m/s.

The Vikhr missile laser beam control system provides for its precise guidance owing to data transmission to the missile in the course of its launch, which is excluded in homing systems. The laser guidance principle is identical to that used by 9M117 Bastion or 9M119 Svir antiarmor missiles. The Vikhr missile control system has low jamming susceptibility because its receiver faces the carrier, thereby protecting it from most jamming signals.

The high pinpoint target hit probability (reported 0.95 against stationary targets) is provided by the automatic target tracking system and highly accurate missile control system that makes allowance for changes in the parameters of the carrier and the target in the course of firing.

The missiles can be fired singly or in pairs (at the same target to increase lethality). The high flight speed allows it to engage targets rapidly. The system is capable of launching Vikhr missiles against two to four targets during a 30-second period and starting at a range of 10 km, which increases its lethality to three to four times that of earlier systems.

Variants
 9A1472 Vikhr-1 – Upgraded version.

Notes

References
 Russia's Arms Catalog 2004
 Jane's Air Launched Weapons, Issue thirty six.
 www.airwar.ru

External links

 www.airwar.ru

Anti-tank guided missiles of the Cold War
Anti-tank guided missiles of Russia
KBP Instrument Design Bureau products
Military equipment introduced in the 1980s